Kenya competed at the 2011 Summer Universiade in Shenzhen, China held from 12 to 23 August 2011. In total athletes representing Kenya won one bronze medal, in athletics.

Medal summary

Medal by sports

Medalists

References 

Nations at the 2011 Summer Universiade
Summer U
Kenya at the Summer Universiade